Jaymi Bailey is a retired American soccer player who played professionally in the USL A-League.

Bailey grew up in Fruitland Park, Florida.  He attended the University of Tampa, playing on the men’s soccer team from 1995 to 1998.  In 1998, he spent the summer with the Southwest Florida Manatees of the USISL D-3 Pro League.  In 1999, Bailey turned professional with the Hampton Roads Mariners.  After two seasons in Hampton Roads, Bailey moved to the Nashville Metros in 2001, leading the league in assists that season.  He was hampered by injuries and spent 2002 with both Raleigh CASL Elite and the West Michigan Edge.  He retired at the end of the season, but attempted a comeback in 2006 with the Nashville Metros.

References

Living people
1976 births
American soccer players
Virginia Beach Mariners players
Nashville Metros players
North Carolina FC U23 players
Southwest Florida Manatees players
Milwaukee Rampage players
Tampa Spartans men's soccer players
A-League (1995–2004) players
USL Second Division players
USL League Two players
West Michigan Edge players
Sportspeople from Lake County, Florida
Association football midfielders